Thirsty Ears is second studio album by Canadian blues band, Powder Blues, released in 1981. Thirsty Ears was the band's follow up to Uncut, released the year before. Thirsty Ears was certified platinum in Canada for 100,000 copies shipped. The title track, "Thirsty Ears", peaked at number 17 on the Canadian singles chart in 1981.

Track listing
 "Thirsty Ears" (Jack Lavin) – 3:05
 "Secret Success" (J. Lavin, Tom Lavin) – 3:57
 "Pink Champagne" (Joe Liggins) – 3:49
 "Undercover Blues" (J. Lavin, Willie MacCalder) – 3:56
 "Lovin Kissin & Huggin" (T. Lavin, MacCalder) – 3:16
 "Joy Ridin" (J. Lavin) – 3:53
 "She's Crazy" (David Underwood) – 3:07
 "Nothin but a Tease" (T. Lavin) – 4:03
 "She Took My Soul" (T. Lavin, MacCalder) – 3:15
 "Will Power" (T. Lavin, MacCalder) – 3:50

Personnel
Powder Blues
 Tom Lavin – guitar, vocals
 Jack Lavin – bass, vocals
 Bill Runge – baritone saxophone
 Duris Maxwell – drums, percussion
 Willie MacCalder – piano, organ, vocals
 David Woodward – tenor saxophone, alto saxophone
 Mark Hasselbach – trumpet, trombone

Guest musicians
 Robbie King – keyboards on track 7
 Wayne Kozak – tenor saxophone

Production
 Brian Campbell – engineer
 Tom Lavin – producer, horn arrangements
 Bill Runge – horn arrangements
 Marty Hasselbach – second engineer
 Michael Gluss – cover photos
 Hank Leonhardt – cover concept and sleeve design
 Julian Davis – Powder Blues logo

Charts

Certifications

References

1981 albums
Powder Blues Band albums